Prime Time was a band formed by Ornette Coleman in 1975 featuring two electric guitarists, two drummers, and occasionally two electric bassists alongside Coleman's saxophone. The band utilized Harmolodics to create their music. Founding members included  guitarist Bern Nix,  guitarist Charles Ellerbee, bassist Jamaaladeen Tacuma, drummer Denardo Coleman (Ornette's son)  and drummer Ronald Shannon Jackson. Later members including bassist Albert MacDowell and drummer Sabir Kamal. 

The band's first album was Dancing in Your Head. Their 1988 album, Virgin Beauty, was their most successful going to number two on Billboard magazine’s jazz chart and has sold more in its first year than any previous Coleman record. The album featured Jerry Garcia on guitar, which granted Coleman and Prime Time a cross-over audience of Deadheads. Prime Time later opened for Grateful Dead in 1993 at Oakland Coliseum.

In 2017, two years after Ornette Coleman's death, his son Denardo reunited Prime Time for a concert at Alice Tully Hall in tribute to Ornette Coleman and Bern Nix.

Discography

Studio albums
Dancing in Your Head (1976)
Body Meta (1978)
Of Human Feelings (1979)
In All Languages (1987)
Virgin Beauty (1988)
Tone Dialing (1995)

Live albums
Opening the Caravan of Dreams (1985)

References

External links

Prime Time discography at AllMusic

American jazz ensembles
Jazz fusion ensembles
Jazz musicians from New York (state)
Musical groups established in 1975
Musical groups from New York City